This is a list of acts of the Parliament of South Africa enacted in the years 1970 to 1979.

South African acts are uniquely identified by the year of passage and an act number within that year. Some acts have gone by more than one short title in the course of their existence; in such cases each title is listed with the years in which it applied.

1970

1971

1972

1973

1974

1975

1976

1977

1978

1979

References
 Government Gazette of the Republic of South Africa, Volumes 56–169.
 

1970